Bangsian fantasy is a fantasy genre which concerns the use of the afterlife as the main setting within which its characters, who may be famous preexisting historical or fictional figures, act and interact. It is named for John Kendrick Bangs (1862–1922), who often wrote it.

Definition
According to E. F. Bleiler, in his 1983 Guide to Supernatural Fiction, "Bangs' most noteworthy achievement was a contribution to literary typology: the so-called Bangsian story, in which important literary and historical personalities serve humorously as characters in a slender plot line. Bangs did not invent this subgenre, but his work gave it publicity and literary status."

Bleiler's definition does not take into account that some of Bangs' stories, including the definitive Associated Shades series whose characters reside in Hades, are set in the afterlife. Jess Nevins' 2003 definition (in Heroes & Monsters: The Unofficial Companion to the League of Extraordinary Gentlemen) says it is "a fantasy of the afterlife in which the ghosts of various famous men and women come together and have various, usually genial, adventures", which closely agrees with Rama Kundu's 2008 definition.

Selected works of Bangsian fantasy

By Bangs
The four Associated Shades books may be considered collections rather than novels. The first three, at least, were first published as serials in Harper's Weekly shortly preceding their publication as books by Harper & Brothers. (Bangs was humor editor for George Harvey's "Harper" magazines from 1889 to 1900.) All were illustrated by Peter Newell.  
 A House-Boat on the Styx (1895)
 The Pursuit of the House-Boat (1897)
 The Enchanted Type-Writer (1899)
 Mr. Munchausen (1901)

By others

 Riverworld series (from 1971) by Philip José Farmer
 Heroes in Hell series (from 1986) by Janet Morris
 What Dreams May Come by American writer Richard Matheson
 Of the City of the Saved... by Philip Purser-Hallard, and subsequent stories by other authors in The City of the Saved sub-series (part of the Faction Paradox series).

See also
 List of genres

References

External links
 "Posthumous Fantasy", entry in the 1997 Encyclopedia of Fantasy – another class of afterlife fantasy, distinguished from that of Bangs (see also)
 

 
Fantasy genres